The Juno Awards of 2005 were held 3 April at the MTS Centre in Winnipeg, Manitoba and were hosted by comedian Brent Butt. Avril Lavigne and k-os won three awards each, while Billy Talent and Feist won 2 apiece.

Nominations were announced 7 February 2005.

The Tragically Hip were this year's Canadian Music Hall of Fame recipient. Dan Aykroyd was originally scheduled to present this honour, but inexplicably cancelled several days before the awards ceremony. Sarah Harmer presented the Hall of Fame award in his place. Both Aykroyd and Harmer have ties to the Kingston, Ontario community in which The Tragically Hip are based.

Neil Young was scheduled to appear at these awards, based on a promise that he would attend if the ceremonies were held in Winnipeg. But the 1982 Canadian Music Hall of Fame inductee cancelled his appearance shortly before the Juno ceremonies following surgery to correct a brain aneurysm.

Other Juno Weekend events included the JunoFest concert series held at venues around the city, the Songwriters’ Circle on Sunday afternoon, and the Juno Fan Fare autograph session with Keshia Chanté, Great Big Sea, Kardinal Offishall, The Tea Party, Thornley, and other Canadian bands and artists.

The following awards were presented during the primary ceremonies, with other categories awarded at a non-televised ceremony the previous night:

Group of the Year
New Artist of the Year
Juno Fan Choice Award
Songwriter of the Year
Album of the Year
Adult Alternative Album of the Year
Rap Recording of the Year
Single of the Year

Nominees and winners

Artist of the Year

Winner: Avril Lavigne

Other Nominees:
Bryan Adams
Celine Dion
Diana Krall
k.d. lang

New Artist of the Year

Winner: Feist

Other Nominees:
Keshia Chanté
Fefe Dobson
Matt Dusk
Matt Mays

Group of the Year
Winner: Billy Talent

Other Nominees:
Great Big Sea
Simple Plan
Sum 41
The Tragically Hip

Juno Fan Choice Award
Winner: Avril Lavigne

Other Nominees:
Diana Krall
Sarah McLachlan
Marie-Elaine Thibert
Shania Twain

New Group of the Year
Winner: Alexisonfire

Other Nominees:
Death from Above 1979
The Marble Index
Thornley
The Waking Eyes

Songwriter of the Year
Winner: Ron Sexsmith, "Whatever It Takes", "Not About to Lose", "Hard Bargain"

Other Nominees:
Buck 65 "Wicked and Weird", "463", "Sore" (all co-written with T.O.A.B. La Rone)
Marc Jordan, "Let's Waste Some Time" and "Shot Down My Heart" (both co-written by Steve MacKinnon),  "Tears of Hercules" (co-written by Stephan Moccio)
Avril Lavigne, "Don't Tell Me" (co-written by Evan Taubenfeld), "My Happy Ending" (co-written by Butch Walker), "Nobody's Home" (co-written by Ben Moody)
Gordie Sampson, "Sunburn" and "Paris" (both co-written by Blair Daly and Troy Verges), "You (Or Somebody Like You)"

Jack Richardson Producer of the Year
Winner: Bob Rock, "Welcome to My Life" by Simple Plan and "Some Kind of Monster" by Metallica

Other Nominees:
David Foster, "You Raise Me Up" by Josh Groban, "Can't Help Falling in Love" by Michael Bublé
Raine Maida, "How Does it Feel" and "Fall to Pieces" by Avril Lavigne
Nickelback and Joey Moi, "Someday" and "Figured You Out" by Nickelback
Track & Field and Nelly Furtado, "Try" and "Explode" by Nelly Furtado

Recording Engineer of the Year
Winner: L. Stu Young, "What Do You Want" and "Man in Your Life" by Prince, Musicology

Other Nominees:
Vic Florencia, "Shot Down My Heart" and "When Rita Takes the 'A' Train" by Marc Jordan, Make Believe Ballroom
John MacLean, Sheldon Zaharko, "Jumbo Jet Headache" by Limblifter, I/O
Peter Prilesnik, "Lucky Me" and "Day One" by Sarah Slean, Day One
Bob Rock, "Welcome to My Life" and "Me Against the World" by Simple Plan, Still Not Getting Any

Canadian Music Hall of Fame
Winner: The Tragically Hip

Walt Grealis Special Achievement Award
Winner: Allan Slaight

Nominated and winning albums

Album of the Year
Winner: Billy Talent, Billy Talent

Other Nominees:
The Girl in the Other Room, Diana Krall
Miracle, Celine Dion
Still Not Getting Any, Simple Plan
Under My Skin, Avril Lavigne

Adult Alternative Album of the Year
Winner: All of Our Names, Sarah Harmer

Other Nominees:
Day One, Sarah Slean
Matt Mays, Matt Mays
Retriever, Ron Sexsmith
Want Two, Rufus Wainwright

Alternative Album of the Year
Winner: Let It Die, Feist

Other Nominees:
Funeral, Arcade Fire
Now, More Than Ever, Jim Guthrie
Set Yourself on Fire, Stars
The Slow Wonder, A.C. Newman

Best Blues album
Winner: I'm Just A Man, Garrett Mason

Other Nominees:
Come On In, Downchild
Fresh Horses, Jim Byrnes
No One to Blame, Rita Chiarelli
Soap Bars and Dog Ears, The Jimmy Bowskill Band

Children's Album of the Year
Winner: A Poodle in Paris, Connie Kaldor

Other Nominees:
Angela May's Magnificent Musical Menagerie, Angela Kelman
The 5 Elements, Rick Scott and Harry Wong
MathJam K, Judy & David
Songs for You, Jennifer Gasoi

Classical Album of the Year (Solo or Chamber Ensemble)
Winner: Bach: The English Suites, Angela Hewitt

Other nominees:
Drumtalker, Nexus
Dvořák, Janáček, Smetana: Romantic Pieces, James Ehnes, Eduard Laurel
Nikolai Kapustin Piano Music, Marc-Andre Hamelin
Takemitsu: Toward the Sea, Robert Aitken, New Music Concerts Ensemble

Classical Album of the Year (Large Ensemble or Soloist(s) with Large Ensemble Accompaniment)
Winner: Dardanus/Le temple de la Gloire: Music of Jean-Philippe Rameau, Jeanne Lamon, Tafelmusik Baroque Orchestra

Other nominees:
Borodin, Bramwell Tovey, Vancouver Symphony Orchestra
Frenergy:  Music  of  John Estacio, Mario Bernardi, Edmonton Symphony Orchestra
Hummel, James Ehnes, London Mozart Players
Mahler: Symphony No. 4, Yannick Nézet-Séguin, Orchestre Metropolitain du Grand Montreal

Classical Album of the Year (Vocal or Choral Performance)
Winner: Cleopatra, Isabel Bayrakdarian, Tafelmusik Baroque Orchestra

Other nominees:
Bach: Psaume 51, Cantate 82, Karina Gauvin, Daniel Taylor, Violons du Roy
Brahms Lieder, Marie-Nicole Lemieux
Italian Oratorios, Matthew White, Tafelmusik Baroque Orchestra
So Much to Tell, Measha Brueggergosman, Manitoba Chamber Orchestra

Best Album Design
Winner: Vincent Marcone, It Dreams by Jakalope

Other nominees:
Tracy Maurice, N. Hilary Treadwell, Funeral by Arcade Fire
Bryan Adams, Dirk Rudolf, Room Service by Bryan Adams
John Rummen, Kim Kinakin, James Michin III, Under My Skin by Avril Lavigne
Jesse F. Keeler, Eva Michon, You're a Woman, I'm a Machine by Death from Above 1979

Contemporary Christian/Gospel Album of the Year
Winner: Here to Stay, Greg Sczebel

Other nominees:
Red Letterz, Fresh I.E.
Living Water, Aileen Lombardo
Phenomenon, Thousand Foot Krutch
Taken, Raylene Scarrott

Country Recording of the Year
Winner: One Good Friend, George Canyon

Other nominees:
Dress Rehearsal, Carolyn Dawn Johnson
"Girls Lie Too", Terri Clark
"Party for Two", Shania Twain and Billy Currington
This Time Around, Paul Brandt

Best Selling Francophone album
Winner: Marie-Élaine Thibert, Marie-Élaine Thibert

Other nominees:
Audrey, Audrey de Montigny
Écoute-moi donc, Dany Bédar
Gros Mammouth Album Turbo, Les Trois Accords
J't'aime tout court, Nicola Ciccone

Instrumental Album of the Year
Winner: Mi Destino/My Destiny, Oscar Lopez

Other nominees:
Celtic Reverie, Loretto Reid and Dan Gibson
Mediterranean Nights, Vehkavaara & Piltch
Rest & Relaxation, Montgomery Smith
A Warrior's Journey, Longhouse

International Album of the Year
Winner: American Idiot, Green Day

Other nominees:
Confessions, Usher
Encore, Eminem
Feels Like Home, Norah Jones
How to Dismantle an Atomic Bomb, U2

Traditional Jazz Album of the Year
Winner: Vivid: The David Braid Sextet Live, David Braid

Other nominees:
Deep Cove, Ryga/Rosnes Quartet
Elenar, François Théberge
Exponentially Monk, John Stetch
Extra Time, The Mike Murley Quintet

Contemporary Jazz Album of the Year
Winner: New Danzon, Hilario Durán Trio

Other nominees:
City of Neighbourhoods, Neufeld-Occhipinti Jazz Orchestra with Sam Rivers
5, Alain Caron
Red Dragonfly (aka Tombo), Jane Bunnett
Sekoya, Sekoya

Vocal Jazz Album of the Year
Winner: The Girl in the Other Room, Diana Krall

Other nominees:
Eclipse, Kate Hammett-Vaughan Quintet
Make Believe Ballroom, Marc Jordan
Open Your Eyes, Dione Taylor
That's For Me, Susie Arioli Band featuring Jordan Officer

Pop Album of the Year
Winner: Under My Skin, Avril Lavigne

Other nominees:
Fefe Dobson, Fefe Dobson
Home, Ryan Malcolm
Miracle, Celine Dion
Still Not Getting Any..., Simple Plan

Rock Album of the Year
Winner: Chuck, Sum 41

Other nominees:
Come Again, Thornley
Elocation, Default
In Between Evolution, The Tragically Hip
Seven Circles, The Tea Party

Roots and Traditional Album of the Year – Group
Winner: 40 Days, The Wailin' Jennys

Other nominees:
Let Em Run, The Bills
In All Things, Leahy
Jimson Weed , Nathan
Migration, La Volée d'Castors

Roots and Traditional Album of the Year – Solo
Winner: Hopetown, Jenny Whiteley

Other nominees:
Acoustic Album, Amos Garrett
Michael Jerome Browne & The Twin River String Band, Michael Jerome Browne
The Waking Hour, David Francey
West Eats Meet, Harry Manx

World Music Album of the Year
Winner: African Guitar Summit, Mighty Popo, Madagascar Slim, Donne Robert, Alpha Ya Ya Diallo, Adam Solomon, Pa Joe

Other nominees:
Dho-Mach (Sacred Gift), Achilla Orru
En Voyage, Les Gitans de Sarajevo
Four Higher, Autorickshaw
Road to Kashgar, Orchid Ensemble

Nominated and winning releases

Single of the Year
Winner: "Crabbuckit", k-os

Other nominees:
"Not Ready to Go", The Trews
"One Thing", Finger Eleven
"Party for Two", Shania Twain with Mark McGrath
"River Below", Billy Talent

Aboriginal Recording of the Year
Winner: Taima, Taima

Other nominees:
Green Dress, Wayne Lavallee
Full Circle, The Pappy Johns Band
KATAKu, Florent Vollant
Pishimuss, Claude McKenzie

Best Classical Composition
Winner: "The Tents of Abraham", István Anhalt

Other nominees:
"A Farmer's Symphony", John Estacio
"Neuvas monodias espanolas", José Evangelista
"Pangaea", Jeffrey Ryan
"Third Symphony", Robert Turner

Dance Recording of the Year
Winner: "All Things (Just Keep Getting Better)", Widelife with Simone Denny

Other nominees:
"All of My Life", Aluna
"Feel Love", DJ's Rule
"Ghetto Love, Extended Original Version", Original 3
"Money Shot", Hatiras

Music DVD of the Year
Winner: Ron Mann, In Stereovision by Blue Rodeo

Other nominees:
Barbara Barde, David Langer, Casablanca Media Television Inc., The Barenaked Truth by Barenaked Ladies
John Small, Hallway Entertainment, Great Big DVD by Great Big Sea
Michael Fischer-Ledenice, Scott Morin, A Night in Vienna by Oscar Peterson
Marty Callner, Jake Cohl, Michael Cohl, Randy Gladstein, Stephen Howard, David Kines, Fred Nicolaidis, Dave Russell, Toronto Rocks by various artists

Rap Recording of the Year
Winner: Joyful Rebellion, k-os

Other nominees:
"Bang Bang", Kardinal Offishall
"F.A.M.E.", Concise
Life's a Collection of Experiences, DL Incognito
Say Something, Kyprios

Best R&B/Soul Recording of the Year
Winner: Keshia Chanté, Keshia Chanté

Other nominees:
Gary Beals, Gary Beals
More, Tamia
Resurrected, jacksoul
What It Is, Ray Robinson

Reggae Recording of the Year
Winner: WYSIWYG (What You See Is What You Get), Sonia Collymore

Other nominees:
Bare as She Dare, Carl Henry featuring Ce'Ceile
Empty Barrel, Blessed featuring Kardinal Offishall
It's All Bless, Korexion
Uncorrupted, Steele

Video of the Year
Winner: The Love Movement, with k-os, Micah Meisner, "B-Boy Stance" by k-os

Other nominees:
 Floria Sigismondi, "The End of the World" by The Cure
 George Vale, Feist, "One Evening" by Feist
 Stephen Scott, Barlow, "Perfect Wave" by Barlow
 Benjamin Weinstein, The Weakerthans, "The Reasons" by The Weakerthans

References

External links
Juno Awards site
City of Winnipeg, 2005 Juno Awards gallery, photos by Tom Thomson

2005
2005 music awards
2005 in Canadian music
April 2005 events in Canada
2005 in Manitoba
Events in Winnipeg